The 2011 BDO Canadian Open of Curling was held from January 26–30 at the General Motors Centre in Oshawa, Ontario. This event was the third men's Grand Slam event in the 2010-11 curling season. The purse for this event was CAD$100,000. 18 men's teams will be playing for eight quarterfinal spots in a round-robin competition.

The competition was marked by an interesting turn of events when the Thomas Ulsrud rink failed to win a game against Peter Corner. Team Ulsrud's loss created an eight-way tie in 2-3 win–loss records, prompting a draw shot challenge and the scheduling of two tiebreakers. Team Ulsrud, as well as Team Corner, Team Middaugh, and Team Higgs, failed to advance in the draw shot challenge, leaving Team Epping, Team Fowler, Team Bice and Team Walchuk to participate in the tiebreakers. If Thomas Ulsrud's rink had won the game against Peter Corner, there would be no tiebreakers. This marks the first time in Grand Slam history that a 2-3 win–loss record could qualify a team to a tiebreaker. The four remaining teams fought for the eighth qualifying spot, and Rob Fowler won the qualifying game.

Mike McEwen won his second Grand Slam of the season in an extra-end win over Glenn Howard in the final.

Teams

Round robin

Standings

Results
All times shown are in Eastern Standard Time.

Draw 1
Wednesday, January 26, 7:30 pm

Draw 2
Thursday, January 27, 10:00 am

Draw 3
Thursday, January 27, 1:30 pm

Draw 4
Thursday, January 27, 5:00 pm

Draw 5
Thursday, January 27, 8:30pm

Draw 6
Friday, January 28, 10:00 am

Draw 7
Friday, January 28, 1:30 pm

Draw 8
Friday, January 28, 5:00 pm

Draw 9
Friday, January 28, 8:30 pm

Tiebreakers

Tiebreakers Draw
Saturday, January 29, 9:00

Qualifier
Saturday, January 29, 11:30

Playoffs

Quarterfinals
Saturday, January 29, 3:00 pm

Semifinals
Saturday, January 29, 7:00 pm

Final
Sunday, January 30, 1:00 pm

Notes

References

External links
BDO Canadian Open Event Page
WCT Event Page
Final on YouTube

2010-11
Sport in Oshawa
2011 in Canadian curling
2011 in Ontario
January 2011 sports events in Canada
Curling in Ontario